Ida Alstad (born 13 June 1985) is a Norwegian handball player, who played most of her career for Byåsen HE in addition to seven years on Norway women's national handball team.

She made her debut on the Norway national team in 2009.

Achievements
Olympic Games:
Winner: 2012
Bronze Medalist: 2016
World Championship:
Winner: 2011, 2015
Bronze Medalist: 2009
European Championship:
Winner: 2010, 2014
Silver Medalist: 2012
EHF Champions League:
Finalist: 2015/2016
EHF Cup Winners' Cup:
Winner: 2014/2015
Finalist: 2006/2007  
Hungarian League:
Winner: 2015/2016
Norwegian Cup:
Winner: 2007
Finalist: 2006, 2008, 2009
Danish Cup:
Winner: 2014
Hungarian Cup:
Winner: 2016

Individual awards
 All-Star Centre Back of Eliteserien: 2008/2009

Personal life
Gave birth to her first child on 30 December 2017, and hopes to be back on the handball court spring 2018 for Byåsen HE.

References

External links

1985 births
Living people
Sportspeople from Trondheim
Norwegian expatriate sportspeople in Denmark
Norwegian expatriate sportspeople in Hungary
Expatriate handball players
Handball players at the 2012 Summer Olympics
Handball players at the 2016 Summer Olympics
Olympic medalists in handball
Olympic gold medalists for Norway
Olympic bronze medalists for Norway
Olympic handball players of Norway
Norwegian female handball players
Medalists at the 2012 Summer Olympics
Medalists at the 2016 Summer Olympics
Győri Audi ETO KC players
FCM Håndbold players
21st-century Norwegian women